Her Costly Affair is a 1996 American made-for-television thriller film directed by John Patterson. The film was initially to be released as Consensual Relations, until lead actress Bonnie Bedelia had it changed. Filming took place in Southern California.

Plot
Dr. Diane Weston is a college professor who teaches English literature. Not entirely happy with her life, she trusts a colleague Sally with her desire of an adventurous life. Because she is not getting a lot of sympathy from her husband Carl and teenage daughter Tess, she isn't bothered with the special attention of Jeff. Jeff is a transfer student he moved after the mysterious death of his girlfriend. He immediately falls in love with Diane and explains that she reminds him of his former girlfriend. She initially denies his attempts to seduce her and focuses on recapturing the passion with her husband. However, when he cancels a romantic trip with her to attend a tennis match with Tess, she agrees to accompany Jeff on a trip.

Unwantedly feeling attracted to him, she agrees to sleep with him, but soon regrets this decision. She immediately ends their affair, but he isn't willing to stop seeing her and shows aggressive behavior. Diane soon notices that he is stalking her and he even goes as far as raping her at a public library. She later threatens to step to the police, but he responds by saying he will tell Carl about their affair if she does. Because he is continuing to harass her, she starts to collect information about his past. She eventually finds out that the death of his girlfriend Ann was a suicide, although Jeff was the prime suspect of murder for a long time. She is further on shocked to hear that Ann was his college professor.

Afraid of what will happen, she admits the whole story to Sally, who advises her to admit what happened to Carl. Later that day, she finds out that Jeff dropped out of college and moved town. Diane finally thinks her life will turn back to normal, until it turns out that Tess' new boyfriend Jack is actually Jeff. She threatens to kill him if he ever sees Tess again and later forbids her from spending time with him, which only leads to an estrangement. The next day, she pretends to be in love with him to help him get counseling, but finds out later that day that he went into the woods with Carl and Tess to go shooting. Worried about them, she admits everything to Carl upon their return. Upset, Carl sends her away and she is soon harassed by Jeff. She tries to run away to a rooftop, but he catches her and admits to the murder of Ann. They threaten to fall off, but are rescued by Carl and Sally. In the end, Jeff is arrested and Diane reunites with Carl.

Cast
Bonnie Bedelia as Dr. Diane Weston
Brian Austin Green as Jeff Dante
Joe Spano as Carl Weston
Gina Philips as Tess Weston
Steven Gilborn as Dr. Sorenson
Roma Maffia as Sally Canter
Andrew Craig as Matt
Ron Brooks as Bob
Gene Wolande as Don
Zar Acayan as Ray
David Ramsey as Shep Walker
William Bassett as Ed Baines
Benito Martinez as Campus Cop
Taylor Sheridan as Chris
Amy Smart as Dee
Jeanne Sakata as Mrs. Beals
Laurie Fortier as Liz
Amanda Carlin as Jeannette
Chris Ellis as Wes
David Quittman as Johnny

References

External links

1996 television films
1996 thriller films
1996 films
American thriller films
NBC network original films
Films about rape
Films scored by Michael Hoenig
Films directed by John Patterson
1990s American films